Raymond Henry Ebli (October 6, 1919 – January 19, 2005) was an American football end.

Ebli was born in Bessemer, Michigan, in 1919 and attended St Ambrose High School. He played college football for Notre Dame from 1939 to 1941. 

Ebli played in the National Football League for the Chicago Cardinals in 1942. He served in the Pacific with the Navy during World War II.

After the war, he played in the All-America Football Conference for the Buffalo Bisons in 1946 and the Chicago Rockets in 1947.  In three seasons of professional football, Ebli appeared in 20 games, nine as a starter, and caught 12 passes for 136 yards and two touchdowns.

Ebli moved to Green Bay, Wisconsin, in 1960. With his wife Patricia, he had two sons and three daughters. He died in 2005 at Allouez, Wisconsin.

References

1919 births
2005 deaths
American football ends
Chicago Cardinals players
Chicago Rockets players
Buffalo Bisons (AAFC) players
Notre Dame Fighting Irish football players
Players of American football from Michigan
United States Navy personnel of World War II